Antony Preston (26 February 1938 – 25 December 2004) was an English naval historian and editor, specialising in the area of 19th and 20th-century naval history and warship design.

Life

Antony Preston was born in 1938 in Salford, Lancashire, the son of the 16th Viscount Gormanston and Miss Julia O'Mahony. After becoming a wartime evacuee, he was educated in South Africa at King Edward VII School, Johannesburg, and the University of Witwatersrand. On his return to England he spent some years at the National Maritime Museum, Greenwich, before becoming Editor of the periodical "Defence".  During the 1970s he was employed by a specialist publisher, Conway Maritime Press, as editor of their Warship annual. He also produced the specialised newsletter Navint. In the early nineties he took over as chief-editor of the magazine Naval Forces at the German editorial group Mönch. He left to resume as editor of Warships in 1996. Antony Preston lived in London until his death in 2004. His son Matt Preston (born 1961 and the eldest of Preston's four children) has gained celebrity as a TV judge on MasterChef Australia and as a restaurant critic-columnist for the Melbourne Age & Herald-Sun newspapers.

Work

Antony Preston was a prolific author both of books and articles, and published on subjects ranging from the American Revolution to modern seapower; the bibliography given below illustrates the breadth of his expertise. He wrote on general military history, as well as most aspects of naval history and modern-day naval matters. He was a pugnacious writer and was usually willing to take up one side of a controversy, even in a work of reference (see brief collection of quotes below).

Memorable quotes

 s - "ton for ton, the least satisfactory ships built for the RN in modern times"
 French  - "unfit for combat with any existing cruiser"
 Fast attack craft - "a fresh coat of paint and a display of flags can hide a multitude of shortcomings"
 German Panzerschiffe - "more of a political gesture than a significant contribution to the history of capital-ship design"
 s - "the most grotesque craft ever seen".

Worlds Worst Warships

The Worlds Worst Warships is a book about warship design. While nobody sets out to design a bad warship, some ships turn out unsuitable for the tasks which they are asked to perform. Notwithstanding his lack of engineering knowledge, Antony Preston regarded the following designs as particularly poor:

 US Civil war era Monitors
 Turret ship 
 Russian coast defence ships  and her sister,  
 Armoured rams  and 
 Russian armoured cruiser 
 Dynamite cruiser 
 British  protected cruisers
 Russian s
 Destroyer 
 Austro-Hungarian Viribus Unitis-class battleships
 French s
 American s
 US flush-decker destroyers (&  )
 British K-class submarines
 British light battlecruisers, 
 Battlecruiser 
 US 
 Swedish cruiser 
 French  heavy cruisers
 German pocket battleships
 Italian  light cruisers (Giussano and Cadorna classes)
 
 Japanese s
 Japanese s
 German s
 British s
 Hydrogen peroxide-fuelled submarines
 Soviet s
 British Type 21 frigates

Bibliography

Only the four most recent Warship annuals are listed; other titles are listed in reverse order of publication.
 Send a Gunboat: The Victorian Navy and Supremacy at Sea, 1854–1904 2007 with Eric J. Grove and John Major
 Warship 2005 (Ed). Conway Maritime Press (July 15, 2005). 
 Warship 2004 (Ed). Conway Maritime Press. (July, 2004). 
 Warship 2002–2003 (Ed). Conway Maritime Press. (Dec, 2002). 
 Warship 2001–2002 (Ed). Conway Maritime Press. (April, 2002). 
 The Worlds Great Submarines: From the Civil War to the Present Day (2005)
 Send a Gunboat! (with John Major). Chrysalis Books (February 28, 2003). 
 The Worlds Worst Warships. Conway Maritime Press (2002). 
 The Royal Navy Submarine Service: A Centennial History. Conway Maritime Press (November 2001). 
 The Worlds Great Aircraft Carriers: From the Civil War to the Present. Thunder Bay Press (CA) (July 2000). 
 Submarine Warfare: An Illustrated History. Thunder Bay Press (CA) (April 1999). 
 An illustrated history of the navies of World War II, Military Book Club (January 1, 1998). ASIN B0006R987I, also Bison (1976). 
 Aircraft Carriers: An Illustrated History. PRC Publishing Ltd. (1997). ASIN B000CORWY6
 Pictorial History of South Africa. Gallery Books (Aug 1989). 
 Janes Fighting Ships of World War II, Tiger Books (1989). 
 Fighting Ships, Bison (1989). 
 Berühmte Kriegsschiffe - 1914 bis heute, Motorbuch Verlag Stuttgart, 1988. 
 (with Richard Natkiel) Weidenfeld Atlas of Maritime History. Weidenfeld & Nicolson (May 1986). 
 Carriers (Modern Military Techniques), Armada (1986).  
 History of the Royal Navy, W.H. Smith (1985). 
 Armed Forces of the World (with Charles Messenger and Anthony Robinson), Gallery Books (1985).  
 Flower Class Corvettes (Man O War), Arms and Armour Press (1982). 
 Strike Craft, Bison (1982). 
 Submarines, Bison (1982). 
 Aircraft Carriers, Bison (1982). 
 Battleships, Bison (1982). 
 Destroyers, Bison (1982).  
 Battleships (Warships). Lifetime Books (August 1982). 
 Cruisers (Warships). Lifetime Books (August 1982). 
 Sea combat off the Falklands. Willow Books (1982). 
 Warships of the World, Jane's Information Group (1980). 
 Fighting Ships of the World, Phoebus (1980). 
 Sea Power: A Modern Illustrated Military History (with Louis S Casey & John Batchelor). Exeter Books (September 1980). 
 Decisive Battles of the Pacific Wars. Book Sales (May 1980). 
 Dreadnought to nuclear submarine (The ship). HMSO/National Maritime Museum (1980). 
 U-Boats, E.P. Dutton & Co Inc (1978). ASIN B0011WGKMS
 Battleships, 1856–1945, Phoebus (1977). 
 Submarines Since 1919 (with John Batchelor), BPC Publishing Ltd (1974). ASIN B0007ALBJM
 Battleships of World War I, Stackpole (1972). 
 V and W Class Destroyers, 1919–1945, Macdonald (1971). 
 (Editor) Super Destroyers: The Big Destroyers built in the 1930s (Warship Special), Conway Maritime Press (1978). 
 (Editor) Decisive Battles of Hitler's War, Chartwell Books (1977). 
 (contributor) Navies of the American Revolution. Leo Cooper (April 1975). 
 (contributor) Navies of World War 3. BISON BOOKS (1986).

Notes and references

1938 births
2004 deaths
English naval historians
British military historians
People from Salford
Alumni of King Edward VII School (Johannesburg)